Than Phu Ying Ploypailin Jensen (born February 12, 1981) is a member of the Thai Royal Family, a granddaughter of King Bhumibol Adulyadej of Thailand and a niece of King Vajiralongkorn of Thailand. She is the eldest offspring of Princess Ubolratana Rajakanya of Thailand. Ploypailin is not in the line of succession to the throne of Thailand as her mother relinquished her royal title when she married Ploypailin's American father, Peter Ladd Jensen.

Early life and education 
Born in 1981 in San Diego, and known as Khun Ploypailin in Thailand, she is the grandchild of King Bhumibol Adulyadej and Queen Sirikit of Thailand and the eldest daughter of Princess Ubolratana. Her given name was proposed by her aunt, Princess Maha Chakri Sirindhorn.

Ploypailin had a younger brother, Poom Jensen (1983–2004), and has a younger sister, Sirikitiya Jensen (b. 1985).

Ploypailin graduated from the Purcell School, England. She received a bachelor's degree with honors in cognitive psychology from the University of California, San Diego in 2003 and an MBA degree from the MIT Sloan School of Management in 2007.

Personal life
As a pianist, she has given performances around the world, including at the Sydney Opera House, and other venues in Europe and Japan. She also has had occasional honorary starring roles in Thai soap operas, dramas, and musicals, including Nemiraj - Scenes from Ten Lives of the Buddha. A socialite, she has been an occasional model for Thai fashion magazines and society publications.

Ploypailin married her long-time boyfriend David Wheeler in Hawaii, United States on 25 August 2009. They have two sons and a daughter, Maximus Wheeler, Leonardo Wheeler and Alexandra Wheeler.

Royal decorations
  Knight Grand Cross of the Order of Chula Chom Klao.
  Knight Grand Cordon with Chain of the Order of the Crown, Special Class.
  King Rama IX Royal Cypher Medal (First Class).
  King Rama X Royal Cypher Medal (Second Class).
  Commemorative Medal on the Occasion of the Coronation of H.M. King Rama X.

Ancestry

References

1981 births
Living people
Ploypailin Jensen
Ploypailin Jensen
Ploypailin Jensen
MIT Sloan School of Management alumni
People educated at Purcell School
People from San Diego
University of California, San Diego alumni
American people of Thai descent
American people of Danish descent